Kathar may refer to:
 Katha, Myanmar, a town in Myanmar
 Kathar, Nepal, a village in Nepal
 Kathar, Punjab, a village in India

See also 
 Cathar
 Katha